The white-cheeked antbird (Gymnopithys leucaspis) is an insectivorous bird in the antbird family Thamnophilidae. It is found to the east of the Andes in Ecuador, Colombia, northern Peru and western Brazil. Its natural habitat is subtropical or tropical moist lowland forests.

The English zoologist Philip Sclater described the white-cheeked antbird in 1855 and coined the binomial name Myrmeciza leucaspis. It is now placed in the genus Gymnopithys which was introduced by the French ornithologist Charles Lucien Bonaparte in 1857.

There are four subspecies:
 Gymnopithys leucaspis leucaspis (Sclater, PL, 1855) – east Colombia
 Gymnopithys leucaspis castaneus Zimmer, JT, 1937 – east Ecuador and northeast Peru
 Gymnopithys leucaspis peruanus Zimmer, JT, 1937 – north Peru
 Gymnopithys leucaspis lateralis Todd, 1927 – northwest Amazonian Brazil

The white-cheeked antbird was formerly considered as conspecific with the bicolored antbird. They were split into separate species based on the results of a 2007 genetic study that found that the white-cheeked antbird was more similar to the rufous-throated antbird than it was to the bicolored antbird.

References

External links
Xeno-canto: audio recordings of the white-cheeked antbird

white-cheeked antbird
Birds of Honduras
Birds of Nicaragua
Birds of Costa Rica
Birds of Panama
Birds of the Amazon Basin
Birds of Colombia
Birds of the Ecuadorian Amazon
Birds of the Peruvian Amazon
white-cheeked antbird
white-cheeked antbird